Baha-ud-din Zakariya (Urdu and ) (c.1170 – 1262), also spelled Bahauddin Zakariya, and also known as Baha-ul-Haq and Bahauddin Zakariya Multani, was a Sunni Muslim scholar saint and poet who established the Suhrawardiyya order of Baghdad in medieval South Asia, later becoming one of the most influential spiritual leaders of his era.

Life
Abu Muhammad Bahauddin Zakariya, later known simply as Bahauddin Zakariya, was born around 1170 CE in Kot Kehror (now known as Karor Lal Esan), a town near the ancient city of Multan, in the southern part of the Punjab province of modern Pakistan. His grandfather, Shah Kamal-ud-Din Ali Shah Qureshi, had arrived in Multan from Mecca, Arabia while en route to the Khwarezm region of Central Asia.

Bahauddin Zakariya descended from the lineage of Asad Ibn Hashim, and was hence a Hashmi, or direct descendant of the same clan lineage as Prophet Muhammad ﷺ.

The renowned Persian Sufi master Shahab al-Din Abu Hafs Umar Suhrawardi of Baghdad awarded Zakariya the spiritual title Caliph in Baghdad, and then assigned him back to the Multan region.

For fifteen years, Zakariya travelled to different cities in southern Punjab, where the order was able to attract large numbers of converts from Hinduism. Zakariya finally settled in Multan in 1222. Under his influence, Multan became known as "Baghdad of the East," and is referred by Zakariya in his Persian poetry:

Zakariya became a vocal critic of Multan's ruler at the time, Nasir-ud-Din Qabacha, and sided with Iltutmish, the Mamluk Sultan of Delhi when he overthrew Qabacha in 1228. Zakariya's support was crucial for Iltutmish's victory, and so he was awarded the title Shaikh-ul-Islam by Iltutmish to oversee the state's spiritual matters, in gratitude for his support. Zakariya was also granted official state patronage by the Sultan.

During his lifetime, Zakariya befriended Lal Shahbaz Qalandar - a widely revered Sufi saint from Sindh's, and founder of the Qalandariyya order of wandering dervishes. As Shaikh-ul-Islam, Zakariya was able to assuage orthodox Muslims, who were offended by the Lal Shahbaz Qalandar's teachings. Zakariya, and Shahbaz Qalandar, together with Baba Fariduddin Ganjshakar of the Chisti order, and Zakariya also befriended Syed Jalalauddin Bukhari, which then became apart of the legendary Haq Char Yaar, or "Four friends" group, which is highly revered among South Asian Muslims.

Spiritual philosophy 
Zakariya's Tariqat, or Sufi philosophical orientation, was to the renowned Persian Sufi master Shahab al-Din Abu Hafs Umar Suhrawardi of Baghdad. The Suhrawardi order rejected a life of poverty, as espoused by the Chisti order that was more prevalent in the Lahore region. Instead, the Suhrawardis believed in ordinary food and clothing, and rejected the Chisti assertion that spirituality lay upon a foundation of poverty. The Suhrawardis also rejected the early Chisti practice of dissociation from the political State.

Zakariya's preachings emphasized the need to conform to usual Islamic practices like fasting (roza) and alms-giving (zakat), but also advocated a philosophy of scholarship (ilm) combined with spirituality. His emphasis on teaching all humans, regardless of class or ethnicity, set him apart from his contemporary Hindu mystics.

He did not reject the traditional of spiritual music that was heavily emphasized in Chisti worship, but only partook in it on occasion. He rejected the Chisti tradition of bowing in reverence to religious leaders - a practice that may have been borrowed from Hinduism.

Impact 
Zakariya's teachings spread widely throughout southern Punjab and Sindh, and drew large numbers of converts from Hinduism. His successors continued to exert strong influences over southern Punjab for the next several centuries, while his order spread further east into regions of northern India, especially in Gujarat and Bengal.

Shrine

Baha-ud-Din Zakariya died in 1268 and his mausoleum (Darbar) is located in Multan. Above this is an octagon, about half the height of the square, which is surmounted by a hemispherical dome. The mausoleum was almost completely ruined during the Siege of Multan in 1848 by the British, but was soon afterward restored by local Muslims.

Many pilgrims visit his shrine at the time of his urs from different parts of Pakistan and beyond.

Writings
Awrad-e-Shaikhush Shuyukh: Al-Awrad : Awrad-e-Suhrawardy
( اوراد شيخ‌ الشيوخ‌  : الاوراد : اوراد سهروردي‌)

See also
Suhrawardiyya

Commemorative honors
 Bahauddin Zakaria Express train is named after him, which runs between Karachi and Multan.
 Bahauddin Zakariya University located in Multan is named after him which is the largest institution in Southern Punjab.

References

Pakistani Sufi saints
1262 deaths
1170s births
People from Multan
Punjabi Sufis